Munich International School (MIS) is a private coeducational international school located in Starnberg, south of Munich, Germany. MIS teaches students from EC (Early Child - years 4-5) to grade 12.  Students travel from an area around Munich to attend the school, with the help of a school bus network that reaches into the area around Munich, even all the way to Garmisch-Partenkirchen. The School is divided into three groups: Junior, Middle, and Senior School.

MIS is an accredited International Baccalaureate (IB) World School which offers all three IB programmes. Lessons are taught in English, and German is the compulsory second language. MIS offers Spanish,  French and Mandarin as third language options.

The current head of the school is Timothy Thomas.

Academics

MIS offers all three programmes of the International Baccalaureate Organisation (IBO) - International Baccalaureate Primary Years Programme (IBPYP), International Baccalaureate Middle Years Programme (IBMYP), IB Diploma Programme (IBDP). In Grade 10 it previously offered students an option to take the International General Certificate of Secondary Education (IGCSE), however since 2016-2017, it has been replaced by the mandatory IB MYP Certificate.

Munich International School provides a co-educational, international, English language learning environment for students aged 4 –18. There are academic standards and a curriculum.

In 2008 the school also adopted a "one on one" laptop program by providing every student from grade 7-12 with a MacBook Air. This program aimed to create a more efficient and interactive working environment.

Mother Tongue Programme 
MIS offers the Mother Tongue Programme for it helps and encourages students to become proficient in their mother tongue or first language. Becoming more proficient in one's mother tongue also helps students in the learning of other languages.

After school activities 
MIS host daily after school activities which a diverse assortment of co-curricular activities that inspire participants to develop new skills, discover and nurture individual interests and talents and share intercultural perspectives while fostering new social networks and friendships. Examples include non-competitive sports, Mandarin Chinese, robotics, etc.

School organization
The school is divided into three sections and each is overseen by a principal:
Junior School (EC 4/5 to Grade 4)
Middle School (Grades 5 to 8)
Senior School (Grades 9 to 12)

Facilities

The school offers a range of facilities including more than 8 equipped science labs, football fields, 4 gyms, basketball courts, tennis courts and modern class-rooms. A Track stadium was added in 2014, a language, arts and design complex in 2015 (LADC), a makers’ laboratory in 2019 and 5.600 sqm sports and community facilities in 2022. The campus is 26 acres and approximately a 10-minute drive to Starnberger See.

Athletics
Munich International School has competitive sports teams from grades 6-12. The school's competitive sports teams offered are cross-country, softball, swimming, basketball, track, rugby, soccer, golf, volleyball, skiing, and tennis.

History
The school was founded in 1966 and moved to the location in Starnberg in 1968. On the school site is Schloss Buchhof, a former castle which is now used as a farm and also houses administrative offices. It used to house arts and mathematics classes as well. On September 19, 1966, Munich International school welcomed its first 120 students.

References

External links

School website

International schools in Germany
Education in Munich
International Baccalaureate schools in Germany
Educational institutions established in 1966
1966 establishments in West Germany